Pinanga crassipes is a species of palm tree in the family Arecaceae. It is endemic to Borneo.

References

crassipes
Endemic flora of Borneo
Trees of Borneo
Plants described in 1886
Taxa named by Odoardo Beccari